Factory automation infrastructure describes the process of incorporating automation into the manufacturing environment and processing of input goods into final products. 

The manufacturing environment is defined by its ability to manufacture and/or assemble goods by machines, integrated assembly lines, and robotic arms. Automated environments are also defined by their coordination with (and usually their systematic integration with) the required automatic equipment to form a complete system. 

Factory automation intends to decrease risks associated with laborious and dangerous work faced by human workers. This system is essentially a solution for the automation and manufacturing of a particular production process of an intended output and/or final/end product.

Automation

Automation has produced sophisticated parts with similar or higher output qualities with minor quality fluctuation. It also can help cut overall manufacturing costs and create safer working environments for workers. 

The use of automation in manufacturing started by using technologies such as pneumatic and hydraulic systems in applications where their mechanical advantages could be used to raise output quality and efficiency in production. Complex and highly integrated systems have since evolved, composed of many different technologies and innovative procedures controlled under High Language programming environments with sophisticated operation drivers. These drivers often are running languages that support 6, 7, and 8-axis controls for sophisticated robotics.

Robotic arm

A robotic arm is a type of mechanical arm, usually programmable, with functions similar to a human arm; the arm may be the total of the mechanism or may be part of a more complex robot. The links of such a manipulator are connected by joints allowing either rotational motion (such as in an articulated robot) or transnational (linear) displacement. The links of the manipulator can be considered to form a kinematic chain. The terminus of the kinematic chain of the manipulator is called the end effector and is analogous to the human hand.

Advantages and disadvantages

The main advantages of automation are:
 Increased output or productivity.
 Improved quality or increased predictability of quality.
 Improved robustness (consistency) of processes or products.
 Increased consistency of output.
 Reduced direct human labor costs and expenses.
The following methods are often employed to improve productivity, quality, or robustness.
 Install automation in operations to reduce cycle time.
 Install automation where a high degree of accuracy is required.
 Replacing human operators in tasks that involve hard physical or monotonous work.[17]
 Replacing humans in tasks done in dangerous environments (i.e. fire, space, volcanoes, nuclear facilities, underwater, etc.)
 Performing tasks that are beyond human capabilities of size, weight, speed, endurance, etc.
 Economic improvement: Automation may improve in the economy of enterprises, society or most of humanity. For example, when an enterprise invests in automation, technology recovers its investment; or when a state or country increases its income due to automation like Germany or Japan in the 20th Century.
 Reduces operation time and work handling time significantly.
 Frees up workers to take on other roles.
 Provides higher-level jobs in development, deployment, maintenance and running of automated processes.

The main disadvantages of automation are:
 Security Threats/Vulnerability: An automated system may have a limited level of intelligence, and therefore is more likely to commit errors outside of its immediate scope of knowledge (e.g., it is typically unable to apply simple logic rules to general propositions).
 Unpredictable/excessive development costs: The research and development cost of automating a process may exceed the cost saved by the automation itself.
 High initial cost: The automation of a new product or plant typically requires a very large initial investment in comparison with the unit cost of the product, although the cost of automation may be spread among many products and over time.
 In manufacturing, the purpose of automation has shifted to issues broader than productivity, cost, and time.

External links 
kinematic chain.

References

Industrial automation